Raymond St. John is an English songwriter, record producer, electric/acoustic guitarist and bassist. He is a former member of the Latin soul band Pride, active from 1979 to 1982.  Sade Adu was also a member of Pride in the early 1980s, and St. John is perhaps best known for co-writing her song "Smooth Operator".

After leaving Pride in 1982, St. John went into hiatus for the next five years, before eventually forming the band Halo James with vocalist Christian James, and keyboard player Neil Palmer in 1988. Their second single release "Could Have Told You So", reached No. 6 in the UK Singles Chart in February 1990 and became a major success all over Europe, bringing the band to international audiences.  Their sole album The Witness was also acclaimed by the music critics of that era, and sold over 100,000 copies in its first year of release, peaking at No. 18 on the UK Albums Chart. However, soon after this, the band split up.

Following the demise of Halo James, St. John remained active as a lyricist and producer for the remainder of the 1990s, going on to write numerous songs for other artists, including several hits in the US and throughout Europe, for performers such as Gabrielle and Snoop Dogg amongst others..

References

Year of birth missing (living people)
Living people
English songwriters
English record producers
English pop guitarists
English bass guitarists
English male guitarists
Male bass guitarists
Acoustic guitarists
British male songwriters